Asen Zlatev (born May 23, 1960) is a former Bulgarian weightlifter. Zlatev is an Olympic champion from the Moscow 1980 Olympic Games in Russia, in the category of up to 75 kg. At the age of 11 he joined the first group of weight lifting trainees in the Vasil Levski Sports School under the leadership of Gancho Karushkov. Zlatev has won three gold medals at World Championships (1980, 1982 and 1986) and five at European Championships (1980, 1982, 1984, 1985 and 1987). From World Championships he has 7 medals (3 gold, 3 silver, 1 bronze), and from European Championships – 8 medals (5 gold, 3 silver). He is ranked second with the number of medals won in total and leads the ranking among Bulgarians by the number of medals won in Olympic Games, World Championships and European Championships in snatch, clean and jerk and total – 22 gold, 19 silver, 4 bronze. For seven years Zlatev improved 20 world and 6 Olympic records. He is one of the three Bulgarians (together with Nikolay Peshalov and Ivan Ivanov) who has not received a “zero” in an official competition. Zlatev was awarded the Golden Kilo award for best achievement at the World Championships in Ljubljana, Slovenia in 1982. He was captain of the national team for 8 years and did not lost national competition for 13 seasons. He competed in the categories up to 75 kg and up to 82.5 kg and was trained for several Olympic Games, but for various reasons he participated only in one – in Moscow, Russia.  From September 1989 until the end of 1994 Zlatev competed for the German teams Limen and Chemnitz. Asen Zlatev was declared honorary citizen of Plovdiv in 2001. He was elected Athlete of the Year for Bulgaria in 1986.

Zlatev was originally intended to represent Bulgaria at the 1988 Olympic Games in the Light Heavyweight (82,5 kg) category. However, two of his teammates who had won gold medals in their weight classes tested positive for banned substances, and the Bulgarian weightlifting federation pulled the rest of the team out of the competition the day before Zlatev was scheduled to compete. At the time, Zlatev was a three-time World champion and five-time European champion, and a heavy favorite for the gold medal.

Zlatev competed at the 2017 World Masters Games in Auckland, New Zealand, in the M 55-59 year group as a 69 kg lifter. He won silver with 78 kg in the Snatch and 90 kg in the Clean and Jerk, being turned down with 95 kg on his 2nd and 3rd attempts to win with a press out.

Career bests 
 Snatch: 183.0 kg (WR) 1986 in Melbourne in the 82.5 kg class.
 Clean and jerk: 225.0 kg (WR) 1986 in Sofia in the 82.5 kg class.
 Total: 405.0 kg (180.0+225.0) 1986 in Sofia in the 82.5 kg class.

References 

1960 births
Living people
Bulgarian male weightlifters
Weightlifters at the 1980 Summer Olympics
Olympic gold medalists for Bulgaria
Olympic medalists in weightlifting
Olympic weightlifters of Bulgaria
People from Plovdiv Province
Medalists at the 1980 Summer Olympics
World record setters in weightlifting
European Weightlifting Championships medalists
World Weightlifting Championships medalists
20th-century Bulgarian people
21st-century Bulgarian people